Kemsing  is a village and civil parish in the Sevenoaks district of Kent, England. Also in the parish are the hamlets of Heaverham,  to the east, and Noah's Ark  to the south. The population of the civil parish in 2001 was 4,014 persons, increasing to a population of 4,218 at the 2011 Census.

History
Kemsing was the birthplace, in between AD 961 and 964, of Saint Edith of Wilton, a daughter of the Anglo-Saxon King Edgar I. The well at the centre of the village is dedicated to her, a plaque on the wall recording the local legend that her saintly presence has given the water healing properties.  Given the village connection with St. Edith it is perhaps surprising that the parish church, Saxon in origin, is however dedicated to St Mary the Virgin.
Another local legend states that the knights who murdered Archbishop Thomas Becket rode through Kemsing on their way to seek him out at Canterbury. Following his canonisation Kemsing became a stop-off place on the Pilgrims' Way, along which pilgrims travelled to visit the saint's shrine at Canterbury Cathedral. 

The lordship of Kemsing had a long royal and noble association: it was held by King Henry II who passed it to Baldwin of Béthune, the Earl of Albemarle. It was acquired by the Earl of Pembroke by his marriage to Lady Alice, Baldwin's daughter. The manor passed later to the de Grandison and Fynes families, becoming part of the estates of Baron Say and Sele. In the reign of Edward IV, Kemsing was sold to Sir Geoffry Boleyn, father of the future queen Anne Boleyn, and later reverted to the crown. Briefly in possession of Anne of Cleves, it was then granted by Elizabeth I to Sir Henry Carey and eventually acquired by the Duke of Dorset. 

The historic village centre area around the well includes the war memorial of 1921 (Grade II listed by the architect Godfrey Pinkerton), a cluster of picturesque cottages and St. Edith's Hall of 1911 (Grade II listed by the architect Godfrey Pinkerton), the front of which is adorned with a statue of the saint and a clock which chimes the hours and bears the inscription:

 
The Women's Institute organisation opened its first institute in Kent in Kemsing in December 1915.
During the first world war St Edith Hall was used as a hospital and manned by the Kent Voluntary Aid Detachment. Wounded soldiers from the western front were returned to England and the hall at Kemsing was one of many facilities in the south east of England used during the war.

Local infrastructure
The main roads in the village are  High Street, St Edith's Road, West End, Dynes Road and Childsbridge Lane. Along West End can be found a motor repairs garage, a 'best one' convenience store, and a chemist, In the High Street is a veterinary surgery and St. Edith's Social Club. In St Edith's Road there is a tearoom. At the end of Dynes Road there is a newsagent, a 'premier' convenience store, a hairdressers, three takeaway restaurants including Chinese, Indian and fish and chips, which are all collectively known as Dynes Parade.

High Street was the location of two public houses, The Bell and The Wheatsheaf, sited directly opposite each other. On 3 June 2011 The Wheatsheaf suffered a serious fire, leaving The Bell as the only public house in the village. The Wheatsheaf was demolished in October 2012 to make way for three private dwellings.

Further to the east at Heaverham is the Chequers.

One mile (2 km) south-east of the village lies Kemsing railway station. The M26 motorway passes through the parish. Between the motorway and the station lies the area of Kemsing known as Noah's Ark.

Kemsing is a key stopping-off point on the North Downs Way which runs north of the village along the ridge of the Downs.

Local environment
The village lies in an Area of Outstanding Natural Beauty, and Kemsing Down Reserve, managed by Kemsing Parish Council and Sevenoaks District Council, lies above Pilgrims Way on the North Downs. It is reached from Childsbridge Lane, and is an area of chalk grassland.

Sports facilities
To the east of the village is the large open space known as The Common Field, used for cricket and football, and the Sir Mark Collet Sports Pavilion, with tennis and squash courts.

The cricket club has been in existence probably since the early 20th century, though no records can be found to establish a firm date. Matches were played in the cricketing field, close to the current site before World War I. The Common Field was given to the parish in October 1923 by Sir Mark Collet, with football and cricket being played there after that. The cricketers used other parts of the village between 1945 and the late 1950s, but the new (current) pavilion was built in 1987, with a new square also being laid, which has been used since that time. There is also a boxing club that operates and participates in local boxing events.

Crime prevention
Kemsing has its own police community support officer and neighbourhood officers as well as being covered by regular police patrols. Neighbourhood officers hold frequent consultations with residents and Kent police.  Crime in the Kemsing fell by 31 percent in the period 2010-2011.

Well dressing 

In 2011 well dressing was introduced to the village. The 2014 well dressing (below right) commemorates World War I.

References

 The Story of Kemsing in Kent V.E.Bowden, 1994, Kemsing Historical and Art Society,

External links

Kemsing Parish Council
An article on the village
St Mary's church
Kemsing Down Reserve Heritage Centre
Kemsing Sports Association

Villages in Kent
Civil parishes in Kent